Giorgia Biondani (born 14 June 1997) is an Italian swimmer. She competed in the women's 4 × 100 metre freestyle relay event at the 2017 World Aquatics Championships.

References

1997 births
Living people
Italian female freestyle swimmers
Place of birth missing (living people)